Shea is an Irish surname that is also used in some countries as a gender neutral given name.

Shea may refer to:

People

Surname

A–H
 Brek Shea (born 1990), American soccer player
 Charles W. Shea (1921–1994), United States Army officer
 Cornelius Shea (1872–1929), American labor leader and crime boss
 Danny Shea (footballer) (1887–1960), English footballer
 Dave Shea (broadcaster) (born c. 1950),  in American hockey
 Eric Shea (born 1960), American actor
 Francis Shea (disambiguation)
 Gilbert Shea (born 1928), American amateur tennis player
 George Beverly Shea (1909–2013), Canadian-American singer-songwriter
 Gerald Shea (disambiguation) 
 Gwyn Shea (born 1937), American politician in  Texas
 H. James Shea, Jr. (c. 1940-1970), American politician

J 
 Jack Shea (speed skater) (1910–2002), American speed skater
 Jack Shea (footballer) (1927–1983), Australian rules footballer
 Jack Shea (director) (1928–2013), American film/TV director
 James Shea (born 1991), English footballer
 Jamie Shea (born 1953), NATO official
 Jerry Shea (1892–1947), Welsh int'l rugby player
 Joe Shea (born 1947), American activist/journalist & Shea v. Reno party
 John Shea (disambiguation)
 Joseph Shea (disambiguation)
 Judith Shea (born 1948), American sculptor

K–Z 
 Kevin Shea (disambiguation)
 Michael Shea (disambiguation)
 Nap Shea (1874–1968), American baseball player
 Patrick Shea (disambiguation)
 Red Shea (1898–1981), American baseball pitcher
 Red Shea (guitarist) (1938–2008), Canadian folk guitarist 
 Robert Shea (1933–1994), American magazine editor and novelist 
 Spec Shea, Francis Joseph "Spec" Shea (1920–2002) (eponym of Shea Stadium)
 Stephen Shea (born 1961), American former child actor
 Thomas Shea (1931-1982), American ragtime composer
 Tom J. Shea (born 1950), American businessman and politician
 William Shea (disambiguation)

Given name 
 Shea Adam, American auto racing reporter
 Shea Backus (born 1975), American politician
 Shea Coulee, American drag performer, actor, recording artist, Winner RuPaul's Drag Race All Stars 
 Shea Diamond (born 1978), American singer-songwriter
 Shea Fahy (born 1962), Irish former sportsperson who played Gaelic football
 Shea Hillenbrand (born 1975), American baseball player
 Shea Patterson (born 1997), American football player
 Shea Ralph (born 1978), American women's basketball player and coach
 Shea Showers (born 1974), American football player
 Shea Weber (born 1985), Canadian ice hockey player
 Shea Whigham (born 1969), American actor

Fictional people 
 Harold Shea, protagonist of The Incomplete Enchanter and sequels
 Shea Ohmsford, character in Terry Brooks's The Sword of Shannara

Other uses
 Shea Stadium, demolished NYC sport venue 
 USS Shea (DM-30), named for John Joseph Shea

See also
 Chaise
 Che (disambiguation)
 O'Shea
 Ó Sé
 Schea Cotton (born 1978), American basketball player
 Shae (given name)
 Shai (disambiguation)
 Shay (disambiguation)
 Shaylee (given name)
 Shays (disambiguation)